Jorge Recalde may refer to:

 Jorge Recalde (rally driver) (1951-2001), Argentine rally driver
 Jorge Recalde (footballer) (born 1992), Paraguayan footballer